Feeling Good is an LP album by Julie London, released by Liberty Records under catalog number LRP-3416 as a monophonic recording and catalog number LST-7416 in stereo in 1965.

Track listing

 "My Kind of Town" - (Jimmy Van Heusen, Sammy Cahn) - 2:56
 "Girl Talk" - (Neal Hefti, Bobby Troup) - 2:32
 "King of the Road" - (Roger Miller) - 2:25
 "I Bruise Easily" - (Fred Manley) - 3:37
 "Feelin' Good" - (Anthony Newley, Leslie Bricusse) - 3:03
 "Watermelon Man" - (Herbie Hancock) - 2:35
 "She's Just a Quiet Girl" - (Riziero Ortolani, Paul Vance) - 2:40
 "Summertime" - (George Gershwin, Ira Gershwin, DuBose Heyward) - 3:10
 "Hello Dolly" - (Jerry Herman) - 3:00
 "Won't Someone Please Belong To Me" - (Bobby Troup) - 3:42

Orchestra arranged and conducted by Gerald Wilson

Personnel
According to Leonard Feather's liner notes;
 Jack Wilson - piano and organ
 Teddy Edwards - saxophone
 John Gray - guitar
 Jimmy Bond - bass
 Earl Palmer - drums
 Bones Howe - engineer

References

Liberty Records albums
1965 albums
Julie London albums
Albums arranged by Gerald Wilson